Arrayán  may refer to:

 Arrayán (TV series), a series aired on Canal Sur (Spain) from 2001 to 2013
 Myrtus communis or common myrtle, an evergreen shrub in Spain
 Luma apiculata or Chilean myrtle, a flowering shrub in Argentina and Chile
 Qualea ingens or Vochysiaceae tree, a flowering plant in Colombia

See also